Kim Yong-mi (born 23 August 1989 in Pyongyang) is a North Korean synchronized swimmer who competed in the 2008 Summer Olympics.

References

External links
 
 

1989 births
Living people
North Korean synchronized swimmers
Olympic synchronized swimmers of North Korea
Synchronized swimmers at the 2008 Summer Olympics
North Korean female swimmers
Asian Games bronze medalists for North Korea
Asian Games medalists in artistic swimming
Artistic swimmers at the 2006 Asian Games
Artistic swimmers at the 2010 Asian Games
Medalists at the 2006 Asian Games
Medalists at the 2010 Asian Games
Sportspeople from Pyongyang
21st-century North Korean women